Susan Shaw (1929–1978) was an English actress.

Susan or Suzanne Shaw may also refer to:

Susan Shaw (conservationist) (1943–2022), American scientist and writer
Susan Shaw Devesa (born 1944), American cancer epidemiologist 
Siu Yam-yam (born 1950), or Susan Shaw, Hong Kong actress
Suzanne Shaw (born 1981), English actress and singer